Corey Lee may refer to:
 Corey Lee (baseball)
 Corey Lee (chef)